Sotto una buona stella is a 2014 Italian comedy film directed by Carlo Verdone.

Cast
Carlo Verdone as Federico Picchioni
Paola Cortellesi as Luisa Tombolini
Tea Falco as Lia Picchioni
Lorenzo Richelmy as Niccolò Picchioni
Eleonora Sergio as Gemma
Simon Blackhall as Richard
Guia Zapponi as Margherita
Fausto Sciarappa as Duilio Tombolini
Sonia Scotti as Luisa e Duilio's mother

References

External links

2014 films
Films directed by Carlo Verdone
2010s Italian-language films
2014 comedy films
Italian comedy films
2010s Italian films